James Davis (born 1893, date of death unknown) was a British wrestler. He competed in the freestyle welterweight event at the 1924 Summer Olympics.

References

1893 births
Year of death missing
Olympic wrestlers of Great Britain
Wrestlers at the 1924 Summer Olympics
British male sport wrestlers
Place of birth missing